Rhodes is a suburb of the town of Middleton, in the Rochdale district of Greater Manchester, England. In 2018 it had an estimated population of 2917.

Amenities 
Rhodes has a church called All Saints on Manchester Old Road, a primary school called Little Heaton Church of England Primary School on Boardman Lane and a hotel called the Comfort Inn Manchester North on Manchester Old Road. Rhodes formerly had a Primitive Methodist church on Chapel Street.

History 
Rhodes was a chapelry in Middleton parish. In 1833 the great calico-printing works were established.

References 

Villages in Greater Manchester
Middleton, Greater Manchester